The Boston Mountains Scenic Loop is one of ten Arkansas Scenic Byways. There are two different paths that constitute the loop, Interstate 49 and U.S. Route 71.

Route description

I-49
The route begins at Alma and runs north to Fayetteville. The route includes the Bobby Hopper Tunnel, the only road tunnel in Arkansas. This portion of I-49 was completed in 1999, when it was part of I-540, to bypass the aging US 71.

US 71
Also part of the loop,  of US 71 is designated as part of the route. The US 71 segment allows the traveler to go at their own pace through the area. There are many areas to stop and explore along the US 71 segment, opposed to the bustling interstate segment. The route also passes through a number of small towns that the interstate bypasses. It also begins in Alma and ends in Fayetteville.

Points of interest
Devil's Den State Park
Beaver Lake
Butterfield Overland Mail
Lake Fort Smith State Park
Prairie Grove Battlefield State Park
Fort Smith National Historic Site
Van Buren Historic District
Ozark Highlands Trail
Pea Ridge National Military Park
Buffalo National River
Ozark National Forest
White Rock Mountain Recreation Area
Lake Wedington Recreation Area
University of Arkansas

History
The first routes through the area were Native American Trails, later formalized into the Ozark Highlands Trails. These rough roads became obsolete with the establishment of the Butterfield Overland Mail, a stagecoach route from St. Louis, Missouri to San Francisco, California that traversed the Boston Mountains in Northwest Arkansas. This route has been preserved in part as Arkansas Highway 265 and is well marked throughout Fayetteville and other Northwest Arkansas cities. US 71 replaced the stagecoach route when the United States Numbered Highways system came to Arkansas in 1926.

U.S. Route 71 in conjunction with Arkansas Highway 23 served the Northwest Arkansas area for many years, but as the area grew the routes became congested. The need for a limited-access highway became apparent, and Interstate 49 was completed through the area by 1999.

See also

References

External links

 Boston Mountains Scenic Loop on Arkansashighways.com

Arkansas Scenic Byways
Transportation in Washington County, Arkansas
Transportation in Crawford County, Arkansas
Interstate 49
U.S. Route 71